WGES-FM (90.9 FM) is a radio station  broadcasting a Spanish Contemporary Christian format. Licensed to Cutler Bay, Florida, United States, the station serves Miami-Dade County and the upper Florida Keys.  The station is currently owned by Grupo Génesis.

References

External links

GES-FM
Radio stations established in 1995
GES-FM
1995 establishments in Florida